Marquette Park, the largest park on the southwest side of Chicago, Illinois, at , is located at  in the city's Chicago Lawn neighborhood.  The park is named for Father Jacques Marquette

History

Planning and development

Marquette Park is part of a system of 14 parks designed in 1903 by the Olmsted Brothers.  
At  in size, it is the largest of the revolutionary neighborhood parks created by the South Park Commission in the early 20th century.   
The Superintendent at the time, J. Frank Foster, envisioned the "new parks as beautifully landscaped 'breathing spaces' that would provide educational and social services to the city's congested immigrant neighborhoods." "Social reformers launched a playground movement for the creation of additional parks." In 1899 and 1903, the state legislature authorized the three park commissions: Lincoln Park Commission, West Park Commission, and the South Park Commission, to acquire property for new parks. "The South Park Commission opened a system of 10 innovative neighborhood parks in 1905, which soon inspired similar parks in the West and Lincoln Park systems and in other cities across the United States."

The original plans for Marquette Park called for "a golf course on two islands surrounded by naturalistic lagoons; indoor and outdoor gymnasiums; swimming and wading pools; a children's playground; formal gardens; and a concert grove." Due to its size, construction of the park went more slowly than most of the others in the system, and several features of the original plan were dropped due to difficulties with the landscape. Still, in 1913, the 18-hole golf course opened and "by 1917, the park included playing fields, a children's playground, tennis courts, propagating houses for the nursery, and a large, classically-designed golf shelter."

In the early 1930s, the Great Depression caused the bankruptcy of the individual park districts. In 1934, the 22 independent agencies were consolidated into the Chicago Park District. After the consolidation of Chicago's park commissions into the Chicago Park District in 1934, park workers redesigned the golf shelter, built comfort stations, and expanded the walking paths in the park to include the islands.

Monuments in the park
In 1935, public support helped secure a statue, located at the northeast corner of the park near West Marquette Road (West 67th Street) and South California Avenue, honoring Lithuanian-American aviators Steponas Darius and Stasys Girėnas who perished during the transatlantic flight of the Lituanica. A large granite boulder monument that commemorates those who served from the area during World War I can be found in the northwest corner of the park near West Marquette Road and South Homan Avenue. Mounted to this boulder is a bronze plaque that reads: "This tablet and adjacent elm tree stand here as a memorial to those from this community who served in the World War 1914 - 1918."

Protests

Marquette Park and the neighborhood surrounding it became infamous for being the scene many violent, racially charged rallies between the 1960s and 1980s.

Civil rights protests

The Southern Christian Leadership Conference, chaired by Dr. Martin Luther King Jr., decided to take its protest north in 1966. During the Chicago Freedom Movement, King led a group of marchers (protesters) into the all-white housing areas near Marquette Park in Chicago. A crowd of 4,000 Marquette Park residents gathered to watch the march, some waving Confederate flags or throwing bottles, bricks and rocks at the protesters. One of the rocks hit King in the head above his right ear, but he was not severely hurt and continued with the march. The Marquette Park residents also stoned cars and buses carrying black people and, after the march, clashed with police. It is a common misconception that the incident in which Dr. King was struck with a rock happened in the Chicago suburb of Cicero rather than Marquette Park, but the Chicago Freedom Movement never marched in Cicero.

The incident at Marquette Park was part of the protests led by the Chicago Freedom Movement, of which King was co-chairman. It was a year-long campaign for open housing, started in January 1966 when King and his wife Coretta moved into a North Lawndale slum on the west side of Chicago. King, the SCLC, and the movement wanted to make Chicago a racially open city. They wanted it to be a place where everyone could buy homes or rent apartments without fear of racial attacks. The march was not as successful as King and the SCLC had hoped. A rather vague agreement was created with Chicago Mayor Richard J. Daley, containing promises (not kept) of open housing legislation and improving living conditions. This march was part of a series of marches coordinated by the Chicago Freedom Movement—the marriage of King's SCLC and the CCCO (Coordinating Council of Chicago Organizations), led by King's co-leader in Chicago, Al Raby.

In 2016, a memorial to Martin Luther King Jr. was erected in the park.

Neo-Nazi protests
In the 1970s, National Socialist Party of America leader Frank Collin regularly held demonstrations in the park. After the Chicago Park District banned Collin, he instead proposed a march in the largely Jewish suburb of Skokie. A Supreme Court decision, National Socialist Party of America v. Village of Skokie, ordered the march to be allowed on First Amendment grounds.

To avoid a violent confrontation with the Jewish Defense League, the ACLU negotiated a compromise where the NSPA would not march in Skokie but instead Chicago would allow the group to return to the park.

Plane crash
On the afternoon of Friday, December 8, 1972, United Airlines Flight 553 crashed two blocks west of the park into a residential area, killing 43 on board and two on the ground. The Boeing 737-222 was on approach to Midway Airport and the crash was attributed to pilot error; there were eighteen survivors, including all three flight attendants. Among the fatalities were congressman George W. Collins and CBS News correspondent Michele Clark.

Description and surroundings

Ashburn Prairie
Marquette Park's three and a half acre Ashburn prairie remnant has a very special history. The story begins during the pre-settlement era at 87th Street and Kedzie Avenue on a  lot near the Evergreen Cemetery. It was at this location that the original Ashburn prairie thrived, untouched by farming, housing and commercial development. The mesic prairie contained nearly 100 species of native plants. Forbs such as Mountain Mint (Pycanthemum verticillatum), Nodding Wild Onion (Allium cernuum), Nodding Ladies’ Tresses (Spiranthes cernua), Purple Coneflower (Echinacea purpurea), Black-eyed Susan (Rudbeckia hirta), Prairie Dock (Silphium perfoliatum), Compass Plant (Silphium lacinatum), and Obedient-plant (Physostegia virginiana) were found at the prairie. Grasses such as Big Bluestem (Andropogon gerardi) and Indian grass (Sorghastrum nutans) were also present.

Looming land development threatened the rare patch of prairie, but a heroic effort by the Park District and members of the public resulted in the prairie being moved to Marquette Park. In the spring in 1993, the Park District dug up several plugs of prairie using a tree spade. Each plug measured four to five feet across. With the important roots of these prairie plant plugs intact, crews carefully transported these huge plugs to Marquette Park. There, the rescue team drilled holes and installed the huge plugs near the edge of the lagoon. Fortunately, the soil profile at the old site was similar to the soil profile at the new site, and overall the prairie rescue was a success. Most of the flowers bloomed the very first year in their new home. As the prairie began to settle into its new home, prairie reconstruction activities continued. Volunteers seeded, planted and weeded between the tree-spaded remnants, and in the areas north of the remnants. To this day, Ashburn Prairie thrives on the commitment of dedicated volunteer stewards.

The prairie is located along the edge of the lagoon, south of Mann St., east of Kedzie Avenue.

Golf Course

The Marquette Park Golf Course is a  nine-hole par-36 course featuring elevated tees and greens as well as spacious fairways. Water comes into play on seven of the nine golf holes. The golf course practice facilities include a driving range, a  putting green, and chipping green and sand bunkers. Billy Casper Golf serves as manager of the Marquette Park Golf Course as it does for all Chicago Park District golf facilities.

Tarkington Elementary School
The Tarkington Elementary School, located at 3330 W. 71st Street on the south side of the park and serving pre-K through the 8th grade, was completed in 2005 and classes began on Tuesday, October 4 of that year. Tarkington is the first in the Chicago Public Schools system to have the U.S. Green Building Council's LEED certification. The school was built to relieve overcrowding on the Southwest Side and will serve up to 1,000 elementary school students.

The two-story elementary school include art, music and science classrooms, a full-serving kitchen and dining facilities, a multipurpose room and a field house that will be shared by the Chicago Park District. The project also involved improvements to Marquette Park, including a new soccer field.

Facilities

Competitive Cheerleading
Basketball team
Auditoriums
Baseball
Basketball Courts
Community Garden
Golf Course
Gyms
Meeting Rooms/Assembly Halls
Men's and/or Women's Locker Rooms/Showers
Parking Lots
Paths (Jogging/Walking/Bicycling)
Soccer Fields Marquette F.C.
Tennis Courts

References

Parks in Chicago
West Side, Chicago
History of Chicago
Martin Luther King Jr.
Skokie Controversy
Golf clubs and courses in Chicago
History of African-American civil rights